Two Nights in Rome is an 1880 American play by Archibald Clavering Gunter.  

Directed to and consumed by the popular masses like all of Gunter's output, it has been described by modern critics as a success, and a "crude but powerful drama."

The play opened at Union Square Theatre in New York on August 16, 1880.  The New York Times noted that the plot was complicated and could not be easily summarized, and "while the entertainment cannot be said to be up to the standard of the Union-Square performances during the regular season, it furnishes an average Summer evening's amusement."  The summer offering closed on Saturday, September 11, 1880.(9 September 1880). Amusements, The New York Times  It subsequently toured, and productions can be found being mounted into the 1910s.(7 October 1909). Canton Opera House (advertisement), Commercial Advertiser (Potsdam, New York)(27 January 1914). The Theatres, Fargo Forum and Daily Republican (1914 production)

Some asserted that the play seemed to borrow from Forget Me Not by Herman Charles Merivale and Florence Crauford Grove, though assertions of plagiarism were not uncommon in that age, The Critic (New York) noting in 1882 that "there is not one scene in 'Forget-me-not' which cannot be found in older writers."

Original Broadway cast
 Joseph Wheelock as Gerald Massen
 Frank Mourdant at Abija Peabody
 Henry Edwards as Herr Franz
 J.R. Grismer as Capt. Warmstree
 J.B. Studley as Louis Bennidetti
 Geo. Devere as Gen. Aubrey
 J.W. Thorpe as George Seeley
 Harry B. Bell as Ferdie Fortescue
 M.B. Curtis as Walter
 John Morgan as Beppo
 Maude Granger as Antonia
 Julia Stewart as Evelyn Aubrey
 Katie Gilbert as Lily Davenant
 Adelaide Thornton as Mme. Sylvia
 Genevieve Mills as Tema

References

External links
 Manuscript copy of play, at Indiana University Archives
 1881 Chicago Playbill

1880 plays
Plays by Archibald Clavering Gunter